Wallingford is a city in Emmet County, Iowa, United States. The population was 197 at the 2010 census.

History
Wallingford was platted in 1882.

Geography
Wallingford is located at  (43.319163, -94.793331).

Demographics

2010 census
As of the census of 2010, there were 197 people, 79 households, and 54 families living in the city. The racial makeup of the city was 99.5% White and 0.5% African American. Hispanic or Latino of any race were 0.5% of the population.

There were 79 households, of which 32.9% had children under the age of 18 living with them, 57.0% were married couples living together, 6.3% had a female householder with no husband present, 5.1% had a male householder with no wife present, and 31.6% were non-families. 26.6% of all households were made up of individuals, and 6.3% had someone living alone who was 65 years of age or older. The average household size was 2.49 and the average family size was 2.96.

The median age in the city was 35.9 years. 26.4% of residents were under the age of 18; 8.1% were between the ages of 18 and 24; 26.4% were from 25 to 44; 25.9% were from 45 to 64; and 13.2% were 65 years of age or older. The gender makeup of the city was 48.7% male and 51.3% female.

2000 census
As of the census of 2000, there were 210 people, 78 households, and 54 families living in the city. The racial makeup of the city was 96.19% White, 2.86% Native American, 0.95% from other races. Hispanic or Latino of any race were 5.71% of the population.

There were 78 households, out of which 32.1% had children under the age of 18 living with them, 64.1% were married couples living together, 3.8% had a female householder with no husband present, and 29.5% were non-families. 24.4% of all households were made up of individuals, and 10.3% had someone living alone who was 65 years of age or older. The average household size was 2.69 and the average family size was 3.27.

In the city, the population was spread out, with 30.5% under the age of 18, 7.6% from 18 to 24, 27.1% from 25 to 44, 20.5% from 45 to 64, and 14.3% who were 65 years of age or older. The median age was 35 years. For every 100 females, there were 89.2 males. For every 100 females age 18 and over, there were 92.1 males.

The median income for a household in the city was $39,500, and the median income for a family was $44,375. Males had a median income of $28,125 versus $18,750 for females. The per capita income for the city was $13,137. About 4.9% of families and 9.4% of the population were below the poverty line, including 15.5% of those under the age of eighteen and 17.4% of those 65 or over.

Education
Estherville–Lincoln Central Community School District operates area public schools. It was established on July 1, 1997, by the merger of the Estherville and Lincoln Central school districts.

Gallery

References

Cities in Emmet County, Iowa
Cities in Iowa